Covadonga  (Asturian: Cuadonga, from cova domnica "Cave of Our Lady") is one of 11 parishes in Cangas de Onís, a municipality within the province and autonomous community of Asturias, in Northwestern Spain. It is situated in the Picos de Europa mountains.
With a permanent population of 58 (2008), it consists essentially of the "Real Sitio de Covadonga"/"Real Sitiu de Cuadonga" also known as the "cradle of Spain", a pilgrimage site dedicated to Our Lady of Covadonga/Cuadonga and commemorating the Battle of Covadonga of 718/722.

History
The Battle of Covadonga of c. 722 was the first Christian victory in the Iberian Peninsula over the Arabs invading from north Africa under the Umayyad banner, and is often considered to be the start of the almost eight centuries-long effort to expel Muslim rulers governing Iberia during the Reconquista. Our Lady of Covadonga is a significant Marian shrine. The Spanish Army has, over the years, named several of its units "Covadonga".

In the mountains above the town are located the two lakes of Covadonga, Enol and Ercina, and the road leading to the lakes is often featured in the Vuelta a España bicycle race.

Sanctuary
The Sanctuary of Covadonga is a monument dedicated to Our Lady of Covadonga that commemorates the Battle of Covadonga. It comprises the
Basílica de Santa María la Real de Covadonga ("Basilica of Saint Mary the Royal of Covadonga"), a church built in the 19th century to a design by Roberto Frassinelli,
Santa Cueva de Covadonga ("Holy Cave of Covadonga"), in which the bodies of Kings Pelagius and Alfonso I lie,
Collegiate church of Nuestra Señora de Covadonga, built in the 16th century and declared a Bien de Interés Cultural ("Property of Cultural Interest") in 1884,
Monasterio de San Pedro ("Monastery of Saint Peter"), and
Esplanade, with the Museum of the Real Sitio de Covadonga ("Royal Site of Covadonga").

Gallery

See also
Battle of Covadonga
Lakes of Covadonga
Alfonso, Count of Covadonga
Edelmira, Countess of Covadonga
Spanish schooner Virgen de Covadonga

References

External links

Covadonga
Real sitio de Covadonga

Parishes in Cangas de Onis
Reconquista
Picos de Europa